As of 2021, there are at least eight operational wind power plants at Ibrahimyah, Hofa, Maan Hussania & Tafila. The Ibrahimyah plant, located approximately 80 km north of Amman, consists of 4 wind turbines with capacity 0.08 MW for each. The Hofa plant, located approximately 92 km north of Amman, consists of 5 wind turbines with capacity 0.225 MW for each. The Tafila Wind Farm is located in Tafilah Governorate in southwest Jordan. In Maan there are two Wind Farms. Maan Wind Farm was inaugurated in 2016 in south Jordan with a capacity of 80 MW, and Rajef Wind Farm reached the commercial Operation Date by October 2018, with a capacity of 86 MW. The 89MW Fujeij wind farm developmed and owend by KEPCO reached commercial operation date in October 2019. The Abour Energy wind farm developed by AMEA and Xenel industries reached commercial operation date (COD) in July 2021. The Daehan Wind Farm, developed by a joint venture of DL Energy and KOSPO also reached COD in July 2021.

Wind farms

See also

Energy in Jordan

References

External links

Jordan
Wind power in Jordan